Loris Néry (born 5 February 1991) is a French professional footballer currently under contract with Grenoble. He can play as a defender or anywhere along the back line.

Career
Néry was born in Saint-Étienne. On 23 August 2010, signed his first professional contract with Saint-Étienne after agreeing to a three-year deal. He made his professional debut on 22 September in a Coupe de la Ligue match against Nice. Néry started and played the entire match in a 2–0 win. In 2010, he began representing France internationally with the under-21 team.

In June 2012, Néry agreed a move to Valenciennes FC on a four-year contract. The transfer fee paid to Saint-Étienne was estimated at €800,000.

References

External links
 
 
 
 
 

1991 births
Living people
Footballers from Saint-Étienne
Association football defenders
French footballers
AS Saint-Étienne players
Valenciennes FC players
AS Nancy Lorraine players
Grenoble Foot 38 players
Ligue 1 players
Ligue 2 players
Championnat National 2 players
Championnat National 3 players
France under-21 international footballers
France youth international footballers